Per Lasson Krohg (18 June 1889 – 3 March 1965) was a Norwegian artist. He is best known for the mural he created for the United Nations Security Council Chamber, located in the United Nations headquarters in New York City.

Biography
Per Krohg was born in Åsgårdstrand, Norway, the son of painters Christian Krohg and Oda Krohg. The family lived in Paris, where Per Krohg grew up. He showed artistic talent early, and studied first with his father (from 1903 to 1907), then with Henri Matisse (from 1909 to 1910). In the early years he worked as a newspaper illustrator and taught tango in Paris. While in Paris, he was also the instructor of future architect Maja Melandsø.

Krohg's work as an artist covered a wide field, from paper drawings, illustrations, and posters to set design, sculpture, and monumental paintings.  After returning to Norway in 1930 he taught at the National College of Art and Design in Oslo.  During the Second World War, he was a forced laborer at the Veidal Prison Camp. In 1946 he was appointed professor at the National Art Academy, and served as its director from 1955 to 1958. Among others, his students included artists Frithjof Tidemand-Johannessen and Tulla Blomberg Ranslet.

Krohg created the murals for the United Nations Security Council Chamber, located in the United Nations building in New York City.  He adorned many other public buildings with large frescoes, including the Physics and Chemistry Buildings at the University of Oslo and the Oslo City Hall.  He is represented with six works in the collection at the National Gallery of Denmark.

In 1950 he received the King's Medal of Merit in gold, and 1955 he was appointed Commander of the Order of St. Olav. From 1936 he was a member of the Swedish Royal Academy of Fine Arts in Stockholm and in 1948 he was awarded the Prince Eugen Medal.

Personal life
He was married twice.  In 1915 he married textile artist Cécile Marie ("Lucy") Vidil (1891–1977). Their marriage was dissolved in 1934.  He was married in 1934 to Ragnhild Helene Andersen (1908–1972).  He was the father of Norwegian artist Guy Krohg (1917–2002).

References

Other sources
Nergaard, Trygve  Bilder av Per Krohg (Aschehoug. 2000) 
Hölaas, O. Per Krohg. A retrospective loan exhibition of oil paintings (New York: Galerie St. Etienne, 1954)
Langaard, Johan Per Krohg (Glendendal Norsk Forlat. 1931)

External links
Security Council Chamber painting
360 degree view of the Security Council Chamber
Prins Eugen-medaljen
Family genealogy

1889 births
1965 deaths
People from Horten
Muralists
Recipients of the Prince Eugen Medal
20th-century Norwegian painters
Norwegian male painters
Order of Saint Olav
20th-century Norwegian male artists